Soslan Lyudvikovich Ramonov (born 1 January 1991 in Tskhinval) is a retired, Russian freestyle wrestler of Ossetian origin.  He is a 2016 Olympic gold medalist. In 2014 he won a national and a world title in the -65 kg category. He is coached by Anatoly Margiyev and his uncle, Stanislav Ramonov.  His elder brother Alan and cousin Hamlet are also competitive wrestlers. In the final match of the Alexander Medved International tournament he beat the current World Champion Frank Chamizo of Italy.  At the 2016 Olympics he beat Toghrul Asgarov of Azerbaijan in the final match.

References

External links
 

1991 births
Living people
Olympic gold medalists for Russia
Wrestlers at the 2016 Summer Olympics
Olympic medalists in wrestling
Russian male sport wrestlers
World Wrestling Championships medalists
People from Tskhinvali
Russian people of Ossetian descent
Medalists at the 2016 Summer Olympics